The first season of Madam Secretary, an American political drama television series, originally aired in the United States on CBS from September 21, 2014, through May 3, 2015. The season was produced by CBS Television Studios, with Barbara Hall as showrunner and executive producer. The pilot was ordered in January 2014, and CBS picked up the series in May 2014. In October 2014, CBS ordered nine more episodes of Madam Secretary, bringing the total episode order to a full season of 22 episodes. In January 2015, CBS renewed the series for a second season.

The series follows Elizabeth Adams McCord (Téa Leoni), a former CIA analyst who is appointed to the position of United States Secretary of State by incumbent Republican President of the United States Conrad Dalton (Keith Carradine). In accepting the position, McCord must negotiate not only with foreign dignitaries, but also with her husband Henry (Tim Daly), and a staff inherited from her deceased predecessor, including his mistress Nadine Tolliver (Bebe Neuwirth).

Cast and characters

Main
 Téa Leoni as Elizabeth McCord, the U.S. Secretary of State
 Tim Daly as Henry McCord, Elizabeth's husband, a religious scholar, and an NSA operative
 Erich Bergen as Blake Moran, Elizabeth's personal assistant
 Patina Miller as Daisy Grant, Elizabeth's press coordinator
 Geoffrey Arend as Matt Mahoney, Elizabeth's speechwriter
 Katherine Herzer as Alison McCord, Elizabeth and Henry's younger daughter
 Evan Roe as Jason McCord, Elizabeth and Henry's son
 Wallis Currie-Wood as Stevie McCord, Elizabeth and Henry's older daughter
 Željko Ivanek as Russell Jackson, White House Chief of Staff
 Bebe Neuwirth as Nadine Tolliver, Elizabeth's Chief of Staff

Recurring
 Keith Carradine as Conrad Dalton, the President of the United States
 Sebastian Arcelus as Jay Whitman, Elizabeth's policy advisor
 Patrick Breen as Andrew Munsey, the Director of the Central Intelligence Agency
 Marin Hinkle as Isabelle, a CIA analyst, friend and former colleague of Elizabeth
 Nilaja Sun as Juliet Humphrey, a CIA analyst, other friend and former colleague of Elizabeth
 Francis Jue as Chen, the Foreign Minister of China

Guests
 Louis Gossett Jr. as Laurent Vasseur, a Catholic priest and an old friend of Henry's
 Shivam Chopra as Sanjay
 Sam Daly as Win Barrington
 William Allen Young as Steven Cushing, the U.S. Deputy Secretary of State.
 Tom Skerritt as Patrick McCord, Henry's father
 Bob Schieffer as himself, a former moderator of Face the Nation
 Marsha Mason as Kinsey Sherman

Episodes

Production

Development
In August 2013, it was announced Madam Secretary was in development at CBS, with the pilot written by Barbara Hall and directed by David Semel. Madam Secretary was ordered to series on May 9, 2014. On October 27, 2014, Madam Secretary received an order for nine additional episodes, bringing the total to a full season of 22 episodes. On January 12, 2015, Madam Secretary was renewed for a second season.

Casting
In January 2014, the pilot was cast with Téa Leoni as Elizabeth McCord, Tim Daly as Henry McCord, Geoffrey Arend as Matt Mahoney, Patina Miller as press coordinator Daisy Grant, Bebe Neuwirth as Elizabeth's chief of staff Nadine Tolliver, Erich Bergen as Blake Moran, Evan Roe as Elizabeth's son, Jason McCord, Katherine Herzer as Elizabeth and Henry's daughter Alison McCord, Željko Ivanek as Russell Jackson, and Wallis Currie-Wood as Elizabeth and Henry's older daughter Stephanie "Stevie" McCord.

Broadcast
Season one of Madam Secretary premiered on CBS in the United States on September 21, 2014, with the season forty-seven premiere of 60 Minutes as its lead-in. The season finale aired on May 3, 2015.

Ratings

Home media

References

External links
 
 

2014 American television seasons
2015 American television seasons
Season 1